Shweta Gulati is an Indian television actress best known for playing the role of Tia Ahuja in Remix and Dr. Nikita Malhotra in Dill Mill Gayye.

Career 
Her first advertisement was directed by Prahlad Kakkar. Later more commercial ads came her way. Her television career began when she was cast in the role of Juhi in the Star Plus show Shagun.

As a television actress Gulati has played a variety of contrasting roles ranging from a girl who lost her parents and was ill-treated by her aunts in Kyun Hota Hai Pyarrr to a spoilt fashionable, rich girl with a golden heart Tia Ahuja in Remix and her negative role of Sonya in Amber Dhara. In 2008, she joined Dill Mill Gayye as a new medical intern.

Post Shagun she went on to play a tomboy Tara in the youth show Kyun Hota Hain Pyarr. She had her first anchoring experience when she hosted the show Pardey Ke Peechey again on Star Plus which looked into the personal lives of the television stars. She also portrayed a grey shaded character in Rose Audio Visuals's Lipstick on Zee TV. She went on to a lead role in Remix, which debuted on 1 November 2004 on Star One. It was one of the first shows to be launched on the then newly launched channel. She was the first one to be cast and was finalized to play one of the leads in the show. She was cast as Tia Ahuja though she was offered a chance to play the other lead Anvesha instead. She took voice modulation training to change her voice to suit Tia's personality. She received positive critical reviews for her portrayal of the 16-year-old girl in Remix. Her work with the then debutant actor Karan Wahi who played Ranveer Sisodia in the show was also very well received.

Post Remix she took up cameo roles in various shows such as Aek Chahbi.., Mann Mein Hain Vishwas and Durgesh Nandini. She took up a negative role in the SET India show Amber Dhara. Her next project was a sitcom about the battle of sexes called Kiss Kiss Bang Bang, which aired on the channel Bindass, in which she played the role of Rhea, the business director at an advertising agency who had no time for men or love. Her clash and interaction with her colleague Rohan played by Akshay Dogra formed the crux of the show. It showcased the battle between a feminist and a chauvinist.

She also anchored Zara Nachke Dikha, a reality dance show, alongside Karan Singh Grover with whom she again worked with when she entered the medical based drama Dill Mill Gayye as an intern Dr. Nikita Malhotra. Nikki was Dr. Armaan Mallik played by Karan Singh Grover's college friend who falls in love with the senior doctor in the hospital Dr. Abhimanyu Modi played by Amit Tandon. In 2009 she hosted Dekh India Dekh, the sixth season of Comedy Circus, on SET India. She has also hosted the Red Carpet of the Gold Awards of 2010. Her latest stint is as an angel Sandhya Shastri in the kids' show Gilli Gilli Gappa on Sab TV.

Gulati has also acted in theatre roles. Her first theatre appearance was as the title role in her play KKK...Kiran where she enacted the role of a mannequin who springs to life. Her theatre experience also includes the play Aastha where she again played the title role. She is currently working on her new play called Wife Time Trouble along with her Remix costars Ashiesh Roy and Karan Mehra.

In 2009 she appeared in a film, playing the character of Neeti Tipnis in Romilla Mukherjee's comedy film Detective Naani, acting alongside Ava Mukherjee, Ankur Nayyar and Amit Verma. She also played suhaani in Jo Biwi Se Kare Pyaar on SAB TV. Her last appearance was in 2017's Sab TV serial Partners Trouble Ho Gayi Double as Dolly.

Returning after two years, Gulati portrayed Janvi Rajeev Bansal in SAB TV's Tera Yaar Hoon Main that premiered on 31 August 2020. But her character dies after meeting with an accident, and thus Gulati exits the show. Her character is replaced by Daljeet Bagga, played by Sayantani Ghosh.

Filmography

Films

Television

Web series

Musicals

References

External links

 
 

Living people
Indian television actresses
Actresses from Mumbai
Indian women television presenters
Indian television presenters
Indian soap opera actresses
Year of birth missing (living people)